Friedrichshagen is a German locality (Ortsteil) within the Berlin borough (Bezirk) of Treptow-Köpenick. Until 2001 it was part of the former borough of Köpenick.

History
The colony of Friedrichsgnade was founded on May 29, 1753 by King Frederick II of Prussia. Autonomous Prussian municipality of the former Niederbarnim district until 1920, it merged into Berlin with the "Greater Berlin Act." From 1949 to 1990, like the rest of the borough of Köpenick, it was part of East Berlin.

The ornithologist Jean Cabanis (1816–1906) died in Friedrichshagen.

Geography

Overview
Located in the south-eastern suburb of Berlin, Friedrichshagen borders with the Brandenburger municipalities of Hoppegarten (in Märkisch-Oderland district), and Schöneiche (in Oder-Spree). It is also bounded by the Berliner localities of Köpenick and Rahnsdorf. The residential area is surrounded in north by a big portion of the Berliner Stadtforst (city forest), and in south by the river Müggelspree (tributary of the Spree), and by the western side of Müggelsee, the biggest lake in Berlin.

Subdivision
Friedrichshagen counts 1 zone (Ortslage): 
 Hirschgarten

Transport
As urban railways, the locality is served by S-Bahn line S3, at the stations of Friedrichshagen and Hirschgarten. It is also served by the tram lines 60 and 61. The line 88, not operated by BVG and partially separated from the citizen network, connects Friedrichshagen station to Schöneiche and Rüdersdorf.

Photogallery

References

Further reading
Albert Burkhardt: "Ein Rundgang durch Friedrichshagen auf den Spuren des Dichterkreises" - Berlin 2001
Rolf F. Lang: "Festschrift 250 Jahre Friedrichshagen (1753–2003)" - Edition Friedrichshagen, Müggel-Verlag: Berlin 2003;

External links
 
 Friedrichshagen official website  
 Friedrichshagen page on www.berlin.de 

Localities of Berlin